Kefersteinia is a genus of flowering plants from the orchid family, Orchidaceae. It has about 40-50 species, widespread across much of Latin America. The genus was named for Keferstein of Kröllwitz, an orchidologist.

Description
Orchids have a long or short rhizome and lack pseudobulbs. Linear to lanceolate leaves form a fan shape, articulated to a sheath at their base. Single flowered inflorescences rise from the base or between leaves, often multiple at a time. Flowers are thin and translucent, with similar petals and sepals. The lip is broad and articulated to the column foot. The column is stout and keeled on the underside. Flowers have four pollinia.

Distribution and habitat
Most species grow in the Andes mountains of Colombia and Ecuador, in shady, humid conditions. Most are epiphytic though some grow terrestrially in humus or moss.

Ecology
Most flowers of the genus are pollinated by euglossine bees attracted by the flowers' fragrance. The hump of the lip forces bees to enter the flower from the side and pollinia are attached to the base of the bee's antennae.

Species
Species accepted by the Plants of the World Online as of 2022:

Kefersteinia alata 
Kefersteinia alba 
Kefersteinia andreettae 
Kefersteinia angustifolia 
Kefersteinia auriculata 
Kefersteinia aurorae 
Kefersteinia bengasahra 
Kefersteinia bismarckii 
Kefersteinia candida 
Kefersteinia carolorum 
Kefersteinia chocoensis 
Kefersteinia costaricensis 
Kefersteinia delcastilloi 
Kefersteinia elegans 
Kefersteinia endresii 
Kefersteinia escalerensis 
Kefersteinia escobariana 
Kefersteinia excentrica 
Kefersteinia expansa 
Kefersteinia forcipata 
Kefersteinia gemma 
Kefersteinia graminea 
Kefersteinia guacamayoana 
Kefersteinia heideri 
Kefersteinia hirtzii 
Kefersteinia klabochii 
Kefersteinia koechliniorum 
Kefersteinia lactea 
Kefersteinia lafontainei 
Kefersteinia laminata 
Kefersteinia lojae 
Kefersteinia maculosa 
Kefersteinia medinae 
Kefersteinia microcharis 
Kefersteinia minutiflora 
Kefersteinia mystacina 
Kefersteinia niesseniae 
Kefersteinia ocellata 
Kefersteinia orbicularis 
Kefersteinia oscarii 
Kefersteinia parvilabris 
Kefersteinia pastorellii 
Kefersteinia pellita 
Kefersteinia perlonga 
Kefersteinia pseudopellita 
Kefersteinia pulchella 
Kefersteinia pusilla 
Kefersteinia retanae 
Kefersteinia richardhegerlii 
Kefersteinia ricii 
Kefersteinia saccata 
Kefersteinia salustianae 
Kefersteinia sanguinolenta 
Kefersteinia stapelioides 
Kefersteinia stevensonii 
Kefersteinia taurina 
Kefersteinia tinschertiana 
Kefersteinia tolimensis 
Kefersteinia trullata 
Kefersteinia vasquezii 
Kefersteinia villenae 
Kefersteinia villosa 
Kefersteinia wercklei

See also
 List of Orchidaceae genera

References

External links

Zygopetalinae genera
Zygopetalinae